Clarkville is a community in York County, New Brunswick on Route 585.

History

Notable people

See also
List of communities in New Brunswick

References

Communities in York County, New Brunswick